The 1916 United States presidential election in Virginia took place on November 7, 1916. Voters chose 12 representatives, or electors to the Electoral College, who voted for president and vice president.

Virginia voted for the Democratic nominee, incumbent President Woodrow Wilson, over the Republican nominee, former U.S. Supreme Court Justice Charles E. Hughes. Wilson ultimately won the national election with 49.24% of the vote.

Results

Results by county

Notes

References

Virginia
1916
1916 Virginia elections